Maryland Route 364 (MD 364) is a state highway in the U.S. state of Maryland.  Known as Dividing Creek Road, the state highway runs  from U.S. Route 13 (US 13) in West Pocomoke north to Pocomoke State Forest.  MD 364 parallels the Pocomoke River and provides access to Pocomoke River State Park.  The state highway was mostly constructed in the early 1930s.

Route description

MD 364 begins at an intersection with US 13 (Ocean Highway) in West Pocomoke.  The highway continues on the other side of the intersection as US 13 Business toward Pocomoke City.  MD 364 heads north as a two-lane undivided road, passing both ends of Pocomoke River Road.  After intersecting Courthouse Hill Road, the state highway crosses Dividing Creek and enters Worcester County.  MD 364 passes through more farmland, then reaches its northern terminus just beyond Cellar House Road on the edge of Pocomoke State Forest.  The highway continues as Nassawango Road, a county highway that passes through the state forest and provides access to the Milburn Landing unit of Pocomoke River State Park.

History
The first part of MD 364 to be paved was a segment north of Dividing Creek, which was built as a state aid road between 1912 and 1915.  By 1927, another segment was built from US 13 halfway to Dividing Creek.  The state aid road was partially reconstructed and the remainder of the highway was under construction by 1933, with MD 364 completed in 1935.

Junction list

See also

References

External links

MDRoads: MD 364
Maryland Roads - MD 364

364
Maryland Route 364
Maryland Route 364